We Have a Saviour is the fourth Christmas worship album from Hillsong Music, which was issued in October 2012. The album appeared on the Billboard Top Christian Albums at No. 23 and Top Holiday Albums charts at No. 42. It also peaked in the Top 100 on the ARIA Albums Chart at No. 82; at No.68 on the ARIA Top 100 Physical Albums chart in December 2012; and returned to the charts in December 2014 to peak at No. 36 on the ARIA Catalogue Albums chart. We Have a Saviour by Hillsong is a collection of songs recorded over 2011 and 2012 with two new tracks, "We Have a Saviour" and "Our King Has Come"; it includes, "Born Is the King", and rearrangements of "O Holy Night" and "Joy to the World".

Amazon.com's editorial review observed "[it's] an album full of inspiring and festive songs soon to become Christmas classics. The seasons may be flipped with December falling in the middle of summer for Australia and there may not be snow, sleigh rides or chestnuts roasting by an open fire, but there is a common love for a baby born in a manger over 2,000 years ago." Hope 103.2's Stephen O'Doherty interviewed Hillsong members, Ben Fielding, Autumn Hardman and Dave Ware, on his show, Open House, in November 2012 to discuss the album. Timothy Yap of BreatheCast opined "[they] have brilliantly taken some of the best known traditional carols and tagged them with newly written material making them less archaic and fresher on younger ears... this is a folky, country-tinged, understated and sometimes even eclectic effort." Jono Davies of Louder Than the Music rated it at four-out-of-five stars and explained, "jammed packed with well known Christmas tunes and some original ones too... [they] have tried to make so many tracks on the album sound uber cool, which means some traditional songs don't sound as Christmasy as you might expect."

Track listing

Tracks 1–5 were previously released on the extended play, Born Is the King.

References 

2012 albums
2012 Christmas albums
Hillsong Music albums
Christmas albums by Australian artists